The main article describes all European Soling Championships from one the first held in 1968 to the announced Championships in the near future. This article states the detailed results, where relevant the controversies, and the progression of the Championship during the series race by race of the European Soling Championships in the years 2010, 2011, 2012, 2013 and 2014. This is based on the major sources: World Sailing, the world governing body for the sport of sailing recognized by the IOC and the IPC, and the publications of the International Soling Association.

2010 Final results 

 2010 Progress

2011 Final results 

 2011 Progress

2012 Final results

Controversion 
The Championship rules of the Soling class specifies that continental championships shall be open to all Countries. The Europeans know two major trophies:
 The SOLING-CUP
 The Swedish Soling Association's Perpetual Prize
The deed's of gift of both trophies specifies that the prize will be handed to the annual winner of the European Champion. In the history of the European Championship there were earlier NON-European winners since the Open character of the event. In each case the trophies were handed out the winners of those Championships conform the deed's of gift. 
Unfortunately the race committee made in 2012 the mistake to hand out the "Swedish Soling Association’s Perpetual Prize", as result of the fact that the deed of gift was lost, to the first European team. As result the names of Karl Haist, Martin Zeileis and Patrick Wichmann were engraved on the trophy. 
 Later after scanning of the paper archive of former secretary Dinny Read the deed of gift emerged.
After this incident a new trophy was introduced in case there is a NON-European, European Champion. This perpetual "Best European Team Trophy" will be handed out to the first ranked team where all team members have a European nationality based on the geological definition of Europe. Their names will be engraved on the backplane of this new trophy. Sofar (16 February 2022) this trophy is not used.

 2012 Progress

2013 Final results 

 2013 Progress

2014 Final results 

 2014 Progress

Further results
For further results see:
 Soling European Championship results (1968–1979)
 Soling European Championship results (1980–1984)
 Soling European Championship results (1985–1989)
 Soling European Championship results (1990–1994)
 Soling European Championship results (1995–1999)
 Soling European Championship results (2000–2004)
 Soling European Championship results (2005–2009)
 Soling European Championship results (2010–2014)
 Soling European Championship results (2015–2019)
 Soling European Championship results (2020–2024)

References

Soling European Championships